Danilevsky, also Danilevski, Danilewsky, feminine: Danilevskaya/Danilewskaya is a surname. It may refer to:

Alexander Mikhailovsky-Danilevsky (1789-1848), Russian Lieutenant General, senator, military writer, historian and author
Alexandre Danilevski, Russian-born French composer, lutenist, vielle player, 
Grigory Danilevsky (1829-1890), Russian historical novelist
Nikolay Danilevsky (1822-1885), Russian naturalist, historian, economist, and philosopher
Vasily Danilewsky (1852-1939), Ukrainian-born Russian physician, physiologist and parasitologist

Russian-language surnames